Gray Areas was a quarterly magazine published from 1992 to 1995 by publisher Netta Gilboa. The magazine was based in Phoenix, Arizona. It won several awards including "One Of The Top Ten Magazines of 1992" by Library Journal. It discussed subcultures involving drugs (narcotics), phreaking, cyberpunk, pornography, the Grateful Dead and related issues.  It only published 7 issues, but continues on as a website.

Issue Contents

Issue 1 - Fall 1992 - Volume 1, No. 1 (84 pages)

 Interview: John Perry Barlow on computer crimes
 Interview: Kay Parker on the Adult Film Industry
 Tape History: Grateful Dead Live Video Tapes
 Interview: The Zen Tricksters Rock Band

Issue 2 - Spring 1993 - Volume 2, No. 1 (116 pages)

 Interview: Attorney/Musician Barry Melton
 Interview: Adult Film Director Candida Royalle
 Tape History: Little Feat Live Audio Tapes
 Tape History: Grateful Dead Bootleg CDs
 Things To Know About Urine Tests
 It's Later Than You Thought: Your 4th Amendment Rights
 Computer Privacy and the Common Man
 An Essay On The Fan-Artist Relationship
 My Pilgrimage To Jim Morrison's Grave
 Interview: Paul Quinn of the Soup Dragons

Issue 3 - Summer 1993 - Volume 2, No. 2 (132 pages)

 Interview: Musician GG Allin
 Interview: Grateful Dead Hour host David Gans
 Richard Pacheco on Adult Films
 Tape History: Jefferson Airplane Live Video Tapes
 Phone Phun Phenomena: Notes On The Prank Call Underground
 Interview: Prank Call Expert John Trubee
 Interview: Urnst Kouch, Computer Virus Writer
 Howard Stern Is Here To Stay
 Worlds At War, Pt. 1: The Gray Gods: A Theory of UFO Encounters

Issue 4 - Fall 1993 - Volume 2, No. 3 (148 pages)

 Interview: Ivan Stang of the Church of the SubGenius
 Interview: RIAA Piracy Director Steven D'Onofrio
 Interview: Phone Sex Fantasy Girl
 Review: Defcon I hackers convention
 Gray Travel: Amsterdam
 Confessions of an Amerikan LSD Eater
 Worlds At War, Pt. 2: The Ultimate Sin: UFO Conspiracies
 A Day With The KKK
 Run For Your Life: Why The Music Industry Wants You To Record Concerts
 Plagiarism: Thoughts on Sampling, Originality and Ownership
 Interview: Solar Circus Rock Band

Issue 5 - Spring 1994 - Volume 3, No. 1 (148 pages)

 Interview: Breaking Into The WELL
 Interview: S/M Dominatrix
 Paul Melka on computer viruses
 Review: Pumpcon II and HoHoCon IV hacker conventions
 Inside Today's Hacking Mind
 Interview: Phone Phreak
 Improving The Prison Environment
 Teenager Joins In The Fight Against AIDS
 Concealing My Identity: A Silence Imposed By Society
 All About Smart Drugs
 Lollapalooza 1993 Review
 Entertainment Industry Lawyers
 Deadheads and the Constitution
 Tape History: Jefferson Airplane Bootlegs
 Tape History: A Guide To Vintage Live Soul Tapes
 The New Music Seminar July 1993

Issue 6 - Fall 1994 - Volume 3, No. 2 (148 pages)

 Interview: Hacker/Phrack Publisher Erik Bloodaxe
 Interview: Adult Film Star Taylor Wane
 Review: Computers, Freedom and Privacy conference
 Stormbringer of Phalcon/Skism on computer virus writers
 A Cyberpunk Manifesto For The 90s
 Interview: Cable TV Thief
 True Cop, Blue Cop, Gray Cop
 Is Jury tampering A Crime?
 Interview: Folk Singer Melanie
 Jimi Hendrix: The Bootleg CDs
 Tape History: Big Brother and the Holding Company
 The Genitorturers Mean You Some Harm

Issue 7 - Spring 1995 - Volume 4, No. 1 (148 pages)

 Interview: Mike Gordon of Phish
 Interview: Internet Liberation Front
 Review: Defcon II, HoHoCon and HOPE hacker conventions
 Tape History: Jethro Tull Live Video Tapes
 Scanners: Tuning In Illegally On Phone Calls
 Confessions of an AIDS Activist
 Adventures In The Porn Store
 New Conflicts Over The Oldest Profession
 Two Thousand In Two Years: A Housewife Hooker's Story
 Psychoanalysis and Feminism
 Prozac: The Controversial Future of Psychopharmacology
 The Gray Area of Drug addiction
 The Art of Deception: Polygraph Lie Detection
 Voices of Adoptees: The Silent Society
 The Gray Art of John Wayne Gacy
 Lollapalooza 1994 Review

References

External links
Official Website

Cultural magazines published in the United States
Quarterly magazines published in the United States
Defunct literary magazines published in the United States
Hacker magazines
Magazines established in 1992
Magazines disestablished in 1995
Magazines published in Arizona
Works about computer hacking
Mass media in Phoenix, Arizona